Worungil, New South Wales is a remote rural locality and civil parish of Tandora County in far West New South Wales.  Worungil is located at  31°43′42″S 142°32′56″E on the Barrier Highway east of Broken Hill.

References

Localities in New South Wales